Adrian Toma Oprea (born 5 January 1976 in Focşani, Vrancea, Romania) is a former Romanian football player. He is currently the manager of CSM Focșani and also the manager of Galactic Focșani, a youth football academy.

References

External links
 

1976 births
Romanian footballers
ASC Oțelul Galați players
FC Politehnica Iași (1945) players
Living people
Liga I players
Liga II players
Association football defenders
Sportspeople from Focșani